The Warren County Special Services School District is a special education public school district based in Oxford Township, serving the educational needs of classified students ages 3 to 21 from Warren County, New Jersey, United States.

As of the 2014-15 school year, the district and its one school had an enrollment of 33 students and 9.5 classroom teachers (on an FTE basis), for a student–teacher ratio of 3.5:1.

Administration
Core members of the district's administration are:
Joseph E. Flynn, Superintendent
James Schlessinger, Business Administrator / Board Secretary

References

External links
Warren County Special Services School District

Data for the Warren County Special Services School District, National Center for Education Statistics

Oxford Township, New Jersey
School districts in Warren County, New Jersey